The Sacred Heart Church is a Catholic parish church in the Bridgeton area of Glasgow, Scotland. It is situated on Old Dalmarnock Road. It is a category A listed building.

History
The church was first built in 1909–10. The architect was Charles Ménart.  The Presbytery (1890) was designed by Pugin and Pugin. Later alterations (1953-4) were by Gillespie, Kidd & Coia including fresco restoration by William Crosbie. The style is Baroque Revival with predominantly rock-faced red ashlar.

Parish
The church has three Masses, held at 5:00pm on Saturday and 9:45am and 11:00am on Sunday.

Clergy 

 Rev. Edward Noonan (1872-1886)
 Rev. Francis J. Hughes (1886-1904)
 Very Rev. Michael Canon Hughes (1904-1921)
 Rt. Rev. Mgr. Anthony Provost Mullins (1921-1955)
 Rt. Rev. Mgr. Peter M. Canon Morrison O.B.E (1955-1967)
 Rev. Denis Meechan (1967-1974)
 Rev. Daniel Moore (1974-1977)
 Rev. Patrick J. Henry (1977-1978)
 Rev. Matthew Coakley (1978-1982)
 Rev. Joseph Murphy (1982-1990)
 Rev. Stephen Dunn
 Rev. Kevin Ryan S.X
 Rt. Rev. Mgr Paul Canon Conroy (-2021)
 Rev. Liam McMahon (2021-present)

See also
 Roman Catholic Archdiocese of Glasgow

References

Sacred Heart
Listed Roman Catholic churches in Scotland
Roman Catholic churches in Scotland
Roman Catholic churches completed in 1933
1993 establishments in Scotland
Sacred Heart
Bridgeton–Calton–Dalmarnock
Sacred Heart
20th-century Roman Catholic church buildings in the United Kingdom